Han Chun-ok (born 7 December 1965) is a former North Korean female speed skater. She competed at the 1984 Winter Olympics and in the 1988 Winter Olympics representing North Korea.

References

External links 
 
 

1965 births
Living people
North Korean female speed skaters
Speed skaters at the 1984 Winter Olympics
Speed skaters at the 1988 Winter Olympics
Olympic speed skaters of North Korea
People from Hamhung
Speed skaters at the 1986 Asian Winter Games
Medalists at the 1986 Asian Winter Games
Asian Games medalists in speed skating
Asian Games silver medalists for North Korea
Asian Games bronze medalists for North Korea
20th-century North Korean women